Speak Hokkien Campaign (Tâi-lô: Kóng Hok-kiàn-uā Ūn-tōng) is a social movement dedicated to the language revitalization of the Hokkien language. The campaign was launched online by some Hokkien speakers from Penang, Malaysia, and is committed to maintaining and expanding the use of Hokkien.

See also
 Hoklo people
 Hokkien culture
 Hokkien architecture
 Written Hokkien
 Hokkien media
 Southern Malaysia Hokkien
 Penang Hokkien
 Taiwanese Hokkien
 Medan Hokkien
 Singaporean Hokkien
 Amoy dialect
 Lan-nang-ue (Philippine dialect of Hokkien)
 Protection of the Varieties of Chinese
 Universal Declaration of Linguistic Rights

References

External links
Official website

Hokkien
Language revival